The Battle of Lincoln may refer to one of the following:

 Battle of Lincoln (1141), at Lincoln Castle in Lincoln, England
 Battle of Lincoln (1217), at Lincoln Castle in Lincoln, England
 Battle of Lincoln (1878), in Lincoln County, New Mexico, United States